Live & Acoustic at the Palace is a live acoustic album by the Used to celebrate the 15th anniversary of the band. It was recorded at a show on October 11, 2015, at the Palace in Los Angeles. It is the first release without the guitarist Quinn Allman. The performance featured guest musicians including a string quartet, pianist, harpist, extra percussion and a three-piece gospel choir.

Track listing

Personnel
The Used
 Bert McCracken – vocals
 Justin Shekoski – guitar
 Jeph Howard – bass
 Dan Whitesides – drums

References

2016 live albums
The Used albums